Marie-Louise Marchand-Thébault (died 2007) was a French historian and archivist, graduated in 1953 from the École Nationale des Chartes.

Working on the records of French colonies, at Centre des Archives d'Outre-Mer in Aix-en-Provence (CAOM), she was involved in locating and managing colonial records in French Guinea, Cameroon, and Madagascar.

Marchand-Thébault was involved after 1958 in arranging and describing the archival records related to Madagascar. She managed the archives section of the Office of the High Commissioner of France in Madagascar, while the archives section of the Upper Territory of Madagascar was headed by Jean Valette. She was involved in arranging and describing records series relating to the Malagasy Uprising of 1947 in Madagascar. She renamed a records series relating to the Insurrection of 1947 which also includes the pre-rebellion period. Originally established by the High Commission under "E" it was renamed "R" by Marchand-Thébault. She also added files that she gathered as part of her tour of local districts.

Marchand-Thébault published important works of scholarship about slavery in French Guinea during the ancien regime.

In 1976 she was appointed as conservator at the Municipal Archives of Toulouse.

Select bibliography

References

Year of birth missing
2007 deaths
French archivists
Female archivists
French women historians
20th-century French historians
20th-century French women writers
Historians of slavery
École Nationale des Chartes alumni